John Ellison (born in 1953 in Elko, Nevada) is an American politician who served a Republican member of the Nevada Assembly since between 2010-2022, representing District 33.

Education
Ellison graduated from Elko High School.

Elections
2012 Ellison was unopposed for both the June 12, 2012 Republican Primary and the November 6, 2012 General election, winning with 18,571 votes.
2010 When (Republican) Assemblyman John Carpenter retired from the Assembly because he was term limited and left the District 33 seat open, Ellison won the June 8, 2010 Republican Primary with 3,162 votes (66.04%), and won the three-way November 2, 2010 General election with 6,905 votes (51.25%) against Independent American candidate Janine Hansen and Democratic nominee Michael McFarlane.

References

External links
Official page at the Nevada Legislature
 

Date of birth missing (living people)
1953 births
Living people
Republican Party members of the Nevada Assembly
People from Elko, Nevada
21st-century American politicians